Charles Whittaker may refer to:

 Charles Evans Whittaker (1901–1973), associate justice of the United States Supreme Court
 Charles Whittaker (cricketer) (1819–1886), English cricketer
 Charles Richard Whittaker (1879–1967), British anatomist

See also
 Charles Whitaker (c. 1642–1715), English politician
 Slim Whitaker (Charles Orbie Whitaker, 1893–1960), American film actor